Parry Sound/Deep Bay Water Aerodrome  is located  northwest of Parry Sound, Ontario Canada.

See also
 List of airports in the Parry Sound area

References

Registered aerodromes in Parry Sound District
Seaplane bases in Ontario